Julio Jorge Olarticoechea (born 18 October 1958) is an Argentine former footballer who played as a defender. At international level, he represented Argentina at the 1986 and the 1990 World Cups, winning the former edition of the tournament. He shared a room with Diego Maradona at the 1986 World Cup.

Career
Olarticoechea played for Argentinos Juniors, Deportivo Mandiyu, River Plate, Boca Juniors and Racing Club in the Argentinian League as well as for FC Nantes in the French League.
He was manager in Talleres de Remedios de Escalada, Argentina.

Career statistics

International

Honours

Club
River Plate
Argentine Primera División: Nacional 1981

International
Argentina
FIFA World Cup: 1986

Olarticoechea's home town of Saladillo, Buenos Aires, installed a roadside monument honoring his football career.

References

External links

 
BDFA profile 

1958 births
Living people
Sportspeople from Buenos Aires Province
Argentine footballers
Association football defenders
Argentinos Juniors footballers
Club Atlético River Plate footballers
Boca Juniors footballers
Deportivo Mandiyú footballers
Racing Club de Avellaneda footballers
FC Nantes players
Expatriate footballers in France
Argentine football managers
FIFA World Cup-winning players
1982 FIFA World Cup players
1986 FIFA World Cup players
1990 FIFA World Cup players
1983 Copa América players
1987 Copa América players
Argentina international footballers
Argentine expatriate footballers
Argentine people of Basque descent
Argentine Primera División players
Ligue 1 players
Argentina women's national football team managers
Talleres de Remedios de Escalada managers
Argentine expatriate sportspeople in France